Roman Chojnacki (1 August 1875 [1879?], Łódź – 22 December 1938, Warsaw) was a Polish conductor.

References
Entry in the Encyklopedia muzyki PWN (in Polish)

1875 births
1938 deaths
Polish conductors (music)
Male conductors (music)
People from Turek County